The Lifan Lotto (乐途) is a 7-seater Compact MPV produced by Lifan Group.

Overview

The Lifan Lotto debuted in July 2015 on the Chinese auto market with prices ranging from 40,800 yuan to 43,800 yuan at launch and was later adjusted to a range from 35,800 yuan to 59,800 yuan.

Engine and transmission
The engine options of the Lifan Lotto includes a 1.2-liter four-cylinder petrol engine producing 84hp and 108nm or a 1.5-liter four-cylinder petrol engine producing 109hp and 145nm. Transmission options include a five-speed manual gearbox and a five-speed automatic gearbox.

References

External links
Official website 

Lotto
Compact MPVs
Cars of China
Cars introduced in 2015